In enzymology, an aldose-6-phosphate reductase (NADPH) is an enzyme that catalyzes the chemical reaction

D-sorbitol 6-phosphate + NADP+  D-glucose 6-phosphate + NADPH + H+

Thus, the two substrates of this enzyme are D-sorbitol 6-phosphate and NADP+, whereas its 3 products are D-glucose 6-phosphate, NADPH, and H+.

This enzyme belongs to the family of oxidoreductases, specifically those acting on the CH-OH group of donor with NAD+ or NADP+ as acceptor. The systematic name of this enzyme class is D-aldose-6-phosphate:NADP+ 1-oxidoreductase. Other names in common use include aldose 6-phosphate reductase, NADP+-dependent aldose 6-phosphate reductase, A6PR, aldose-6-P reductase, aldose-6-phosphate reductase, alditol 6-phosphate:NADP+ 1-oxidoreductase, and aldose-6-phosphate reductase (NADPH).

References

 

EC 1.1.1
NADPH-dependent enzymes
Enzymes of unknown structure